Since the impeachment of Dilma Rousseff as President of Brazil became a subject of debated and taking a lot of space in the media, the main polling institutes of the country made many opinion polls about it.

Opinion polls

Public opinion
In general, the questions made to electors were: "Should Dilma Rousseff be removed from the Presidency?" or "Should the National Congress open an impeachment process against President Dilma?"

Federal Deputies
Datafolha also interviewed 315 federal deputies, between 7 and 18 December 2015. 215 congressmen and congresswomen (42%) were favorable to the impeach. As 342 votes were needed, there were 127 votes to go. On the other side, 159 deputies (31%) said that they would vote against the impeachment, so 12 more votes were needed to reach the 171 votes, which would avoid the process. The 27% left were indecised. Among the government supporters, 26% of them were favorable and 33% of the PMDB members wanted the impeachment. The poll should a slight improvement for President Rousseff, comparing to another poll published in October 2015.

References

Opinion polling in Brazil
Dilma Rousseff